Ferran Sunyer i Balaguer (born 1912, Figueres - 27 December 1967, Barcelona) was a Spanish mathematician. He is the namesake of the Ferran Sunyer i Balaguer Prize in mathematics. Ferran Sunyer was born with almost complete physical disabilities and never went to school because his doctor advised that Ferran should not be submitted to such stress. Ferran was home schooled by his mother and developed great interest in mathematics.

It wasn't until 9 December 1967, 18 days prior to his death, that his confirmation as a scientific member was made public by the Divisió de Ciencias Matemá, Médicas y de Naturaleza of the Council.

References

External links
 Ferran Sunyer i Balaguer Foundation  

Scientists from Catalonia
Spanish scientists
1912 births
1967 deaths
20th-century Spanish mathematicians